WESV-LD, virtual channel 40 (UHF digital channel 31), is a low-powered Estrella TV owned-and-operated television station licensed to Chicago, Illinois, United States. The station is owned by Estrella Media. The station transmits from the Willis Tower.

History
Prior to becoming an Estrella TV affiliate, this station was licensed to Palatine and it was owned by Trinity Broadcasting Network. It was used as a translator of full-power station WWTO-TV (channel 35) in LaSalle for Chicago's northwest suburbs before moving to Chicago proper in the digital age. Liberman bought the license in February 2010. The sale was closed on December 6 and the station signed on with Estrella TV programming the following day.

Digital channels

References

External links

Estrella TV affiliates
ESV-LD
Television channels and stations established in 1987
1987 establishments in Illinois
ESV-LD
Low-power television stations in the United States
Estrella Media stations